Gemmula reticulata is an extinct species of sea snail, a marine gastropod mollusk in the family Turridae, the turrids.

Description

Distribution
Fossils of this marine species have been found in New Zealand.

References

 Marshall, P. (1919). Fauna of the Hampden beds and classification of the Oamaru system. Transactions of the New Zealand Institute. 51: 226–250.
 Maxwell, P.A. (2009). Cenozoic Mollusca. pp 232–254 in Gordon, D.P. (ed.) New Zealand inventory of biodiversity. Volume one. Kingdom Animalia: Radiata, Lophotrochozoa, Deuterostomia. Canterbury University Press, Christchurch

reticulata
Gastropods described in 1919
Gastropods of New Zealand